The Christian Brothers Grammar School, Omagh (known locally as CBS Omagh, Omagh CBS, or the Brothers) is a boys grammar school in Omagh, County Tyrone, Northern Ireland. It is the largest grammar school in Omagh. It is under the trusteeship of the Edmund Rice Schools Trust (NI).

History

The school was founded on 14 January 1861, on Mount St. Columba. The building has since gone into other use as a retreat. A primary school, Holy Trinity (previously St Colmcille), has been the school there since. Its original headmaster was Brother John Redmond. On its first day of activity one hundred and twenty boys, all aged between five and fifteen, showed up.

In 1902 an extension, a second floor to the school and a third to the brothers' house, was added. This came at the time a considerable cost of £1,200 partly financed by an £800 loan from past pupils. Operations of the school were moved to old Church, Brook Street while construction was under way. Once finished the renovations provided the school with three more rooms; one for Manual Instruction, a sixty student accommodating classroom and a room with all the necessities for Practical and Experimental Science.

The school moved to is present site on Kevlin Road in 1967. In 1993, after the resignation of Brother McCrohan, the school appointed  its first non-clerical headmaster, Roddy Tierney, a former pupil of the school and a teacher in the school. The Principal is Foncy McConnell who was appointed in March 2016, having been acting Principal for the previous year, and previously  Vice Principal, having taught in the school since 1987. Like Tierney he is a former pupil of Omagh CBS.

It is planned that by 2026, the school will relocate with five other schools to a shared campus. The other schools are Loreto Grammar School, Omagh, Omagh High School, Sacred Heart College, Omagh and Omagh Academy which will join Arvalee Special School. This Strule Shared Education Campus is the largest ever school-building project in Northern Ireland.

Academics
The school's focus is academic, offering compulsory subjects of English Literature, English Language, Science, and Mathematics until GCSE. 
The School also focuses on the teachings of the Catholic faith, making Religious Studies compulsory at GCSE, and as a subsidiary weekly lesson during A Level years.

In 2018, 94.2% of its entrants achieved five or more GCSEs at grades A* to C, including the core subjects English and Maths.

In 2019 the school was ranked 18th out of 159 secondary schools in Northern Ireland with 86.7% of its A-level students who sat the exams in 2017/18 being awarded three A*-C grades.

Sports
In Gaelic football, the school has won the MacRory Cup (the highest level for Ulster schools) in 1974, 2001, 2005, 2007 and 2023 and the All Ireland Hogan Cup in 2007. and many other under-age level competitions for example Omagh CBS won the Rannafast Cup in 2009 and 2012  and the McCormick cup in 2008, 2009 and 2011

Notable former pupils

 Brian D'Arcy (born 1945)—priest, writer and broadcaster
 Mickey Harte (born 1952)—Gaelic football manager
 Aaron McCormack (born 1971)—business executive
 Barry McElduff (born 1962)—Sinn Féin politician
 Joe McMahon (born 1983)—Gaelic footballer
 Gerard McSorley (born 1950)—actor
 Stephen O'Neill (born 1980)—Gaelic footballer
 Phil Taggart (born 1986)—DJ and radio presenter

See also
Christian Brothers of Ireland
Edmund Rice

References

External links
 

Congregation of Christian Brothers secondary schools in Northern Ireland
Grammar schools in County Tyrone
Omagh
Boys' schools in Northern Ireland

Educational institutions established in 1861
1861 establishments in Ireland
Catholic secondary schools in Northern Ireland
Secondary schools in County Tyrone